Nitrosomonas communis is an ammonia-oxidizing, gram-negative, bacterium from the genus of Nitrosomonas which was isolated from the rhizoplane of the reed (Phragmites communis) from a wastewater treatment plant.

References

External links
Type strain of Nitrosomonas communis at BacDive -  the Bacterial Diversity Metadatabase

Nitrosomonadaceae
Bacteria described in 2001